Graeme MacKay (born 23 September 1968) is the Hamilton Spectator's resident editorial cartoonist. Born in 1968, grew up in Dundas, Ontario. A graduate from Parkside High School in Dundas, Graeme attended the University of Ottawa majoring in History and Political Science. There he submitted cartoons to the student newspaper, The Fulcrum, and was elected as graphics editor by newspaper staff. Between 1989 and 1991 he illustrated and, along with writer Paul Nichols, co-wrote a weekly comic strip, entitled "Alas & Alack", a satire of current day public figures framed in a medieval setting.

After a 2-year working tour through Europe and North Africa he returned to Canada in 1994, and began getting illustrations published on a freelance basis in various newspapers and magazines, among them, The Toronto Star, The Ottawa Citizen, The Chicago Tribune, Canadian Forum, and Policy Options, published by the Institute for Research on Public Policy.

Between 1995 and 1997, he regularly submitted and had local editorial cartoons published in the Ancaster News and other Brabant newspapers (now owned by Metroland Media Group), under the pseudonym "Ham."

His work caught the eye of The Hamilton Spectator and in 1997, he was hired as a full-time editorial cartoonist

Besides creating five editorial cartoons per week for the Spectator, Graeme's work is nationally syndicated through Artizans. Through distribution his cartoons appear across the Internet and in newspapers, big and small, throughout Canada, and occasionally in the United States.

Between 1999 and 2003, Graeme illustrated a comic strip exclusively for the Hamilton Spectator called Gridlock featuring 5 characters working at a fictitious local taxi company called Hammercab. Gridlock's creation came about through a partnership with Wade Hemsworth, a columnist at the Hamilton Spectator, who wrote the scripts.

Between 2008 and 2010 Graeme was president of the Association of Canadian Editorial Cartoonists, and hosted its biennial gathering in Hamilton in September, 2010.

Graeme has lived in Hamilton, Ottawa, Toronto and London UK, for 18 months (1994) as a counter clerk in the food halls of Harrods in Knightsbridge, London, UK. He now resides in Hamilton, with his wife Wendi, and their daughters, Gillian and Jacqueline.

Citations 
The Duncan MacPherson Award, 2nd place, 1996  
The United Nations/Ranan Lurie Political Cartoon Awards, 2006
The United Nations/Ranan Lurie Political Cartoon Awards, 2013
The George Townsend Award, (Finalist - English language category) 2014
The George Townsend Award, 2018
The George Townsend Award, 2020
National Newspaper Award finalist, 2020
National Newspaper Award finalist, 2021

Controversy 
On August 22, 2017, an editorial cartoon by MacKay was published in the Hamilton Spectator depicting a person wearing a Nazi uniform and holding a tiki torch being beaten and hit by four hippies holding peace-themed signs. BentQ, Hamilton's LGBTQ2SI+ Media and Community Hub, responded to this cartoon in an article that identified the cartoon's Nazi sympathizing nature and its similarities, however unintentional, with Neo-Nazi propaganda. The cartoon was met with discord on MacKay's Facebook page, which led to MacKay taking the cartoon down.

On March 22, 2018, an editorial cartoon by MacKay was published in the Hamilton Spectator which depicted a person presenting as female being asked by a clerk at a Service Canada desk how they would like to be addressed. The individual answers that they are "the serene highness and extraordinary companion of the illustrious order" and continues in this vein, ending with "In Ms. Chatsworth’s Gifted Class I went by Phil". The cartoon was referencing Service Canada's recent directive instructing its employees who interact with the public to stay away from terms such as Mr., Mrs., father and mother, and to "use gender-neutral language or gender-inclusive language." MacKay's cartoon was met with backlash regarding its transphobic message.

On August 24, 2018, an editorial cartoon by MacKay was published in the Hamilton Spectator which depicted Ontario Premier Doug Ford looking directly into the light of an overhead slide projection showing an anatomical cross-section of the male pelvic region, titled "The Penis." Ford is shown positioned with part of the slide projecting male sex organs on his face with a caption stating, "A sex-ed snitch line has been set up to report any funny business." The cartoon was in response to the Progressive Conservative government's repeal of the 2015 Ontario sex education curriculum, and subsequent decision to seek reports of teachers not using the  pre-existing curriculum taught between 1992 and 2015. The cartoon provoked criticism and led to publication in The Hamilton Spectator of letters to the editor, and a column written, in defence of the cartoon, by the newspaper's Editor-in-Chief, Paul Berton.

On August 20, 2021, an editorial cartoon by MacKay comparing and contrasting the Taliban with the Conservative Party of Canada elicited several complaints and letters to the editor of The Hamilton Spectator of unfair and biased coverage. The cartoon appeared during the first week of the 2021 Canadian federal election campaign and is formatted as a split screen. The top frame shows a Taliban leader, surrounded by armed militia, giving assurance that, "...we're not the old Taliban.", after declaring control of Afghanistan; Set alongside in a lower frame are surley Conservative supporters with leader Erin O'Toole stating, "...we're not the old Conservative Party." Letter writers expressed offence to such a comparison, while others justified the negative reaction to the editorial cartoon as what is to be expected with satire.

Exhibitions 
Participant, "Bye Bye Jean", 2003, La Galerie Rouge, 228 rue Saint-Joseph, Quebec City, Quebec, Canada
Participant, "Halifax Pub Scrawl", 2005, Economy Shoe Shop, 1663 Argyle St, Halifax, Nova Scotia, Canada
Participant, "Bush Leaguers: Cartoonists Take on the White House", 2007, Washington D.C., USA exhibited in Pittsburgh PA., and Columbus, OH.
Participant, "Doodles to Digital: Editorial Cartooning in the 21st Century", 2010, Hamilton, Ontario, Canada
Participant, "Polar Lines", 2011, National Arts Centre, Ottawa, Ontario, Canada
Participant, "World Press Cartoon 2012", Sintra, Portugal
Participant, "Cartoonist Amigos", 2014, Havana, Cuba
Participant, "The Auld Acquaintance" travelling exhibit on Scotland independence, 2014; St.Just-le-Martel, France; London, UK; Glasgow, UK, Lleida, Spain; Limoges, France; Edinburgh, UK
Participant, "This is Serious: Canadian Indie Comics", June 21, 2019 to January 5, 2020; Art Gallery of Hamilton, Hamilton, Ontario, Canada

Publications
 You Might Be From Hamilton If... published by MacIntyre Purcell Publishing Inc., 2017  
 "Mennonite Cobbler: Balancing Faith and Tradition in a Turbulent World" (Illustrations), published by AuthorHouse, 2016 
 "Best Editorial Cartoons of the Year", Pelican Publishing Company; 2002, 2006, 2007, 2010, 2012  
 "Portfoolio: The Year's Best Canadian Editorial Cartoons", editions 16 - 25 (2000-2013); published by McClelland & Stewart

References

External links
 
 Artizans Syndicate Archives of syndicated works
  The Association of Canadian Editorial Cartoonists
  Daryl Cagle's Political Cartoonist Index
 Lambiek Comiclopedia article.

1968 births
Canadian editorial cartoonists
Canadian cartoonists
Canadian comics artists
Living people
Artists from Hamilton, Ontario
People from Dundas, Ontario